Edgar Lee "Bill" Bailey (April 12, 1916 – April 9, 1990) was a professional American football player who played wide receiver for the Brooklyn Dodgers.

References

1916 births
1990 deaths
American football wide receivers
Brooklyn Dodgers (NFL) players
Duke Blue Devils football players